The Group of Latin America and Caribbean Countries, or GRULAC, is one of the five United Nations Regional Groups composed of 33 Member States from Central and South America, as well as some islands in the West Indies. Its members compose 17% of all United Nations members.

The Group, as with all the regional groups, is a non-binding dialogue group where subjects concerning regional and international matters are discussed. Additionally, the Group works to help allocates seats on United Nations bodies by nominating candidates from the region.

Member States 
The following are the Member States of the Latin American and Caribbean Group:

Representation

Security Council 
The Latin American and Caribbean Group currently holds two seats on the Security Council, both non-permanent. The current members of the Security Council from the Group are:

Economic and Social Council 
The Latin American and Caribbean Group currently holds 10 seats on the United Nations Economic and Social Council. The current members of the Economic and Social Council from the Group are:

Human Rights Council 
The Latin American and Caribbean Group currently holds eight seats on the United Nations Human Rights Council. The current members of the Economic and Social Council from the Group are:

Presidency of the General Assembly 
Every five years in the years ending in 3 and 8, the  Latin American and Caribbean Group is eligible to elect a president to the General Assembly.

The following is a list of presidents from the Group since its official creation in 1963:

Timeline of membership 
As the Latin American and the Caribbean changed significantly over time, the number of its members had also changed.

See also
 United Nations Regional Groups
 List of members of the United Nations Security Council
 List of members of the United Nations Economic and Social Council

Role 
The Group plays a major role in promoting the region's interests. It provides a forum for Member States to exchange opinions on international issues, carry out follow-up on the topics that are being discussed in international organisations, build common positions on complex issues and prepare statements reflecting the joint position of the Group.

However, most importantly, the Group allows for the discussion and coordination of support for candidates for different United nations organisations from the region.

Regular meetings of the Group take place in Geneva. The most common topics discussed at these meetings are human rights, environment, intellectual property, labour rights, trade and development and telecommunications.

Locations 
The Group maintains various offices across the globe:

 Rome
 The two offices in Rome focus on bilateral and multilateral issues, particular those of the United Nations agencies based in Rome.
 Vienna
 The office in Vienna focuses candidate memberships to the Group. It also deals with issues relating to: the United Nations Office at Vienna, the International Atomic Energy Agency, the Preparatory Commission for the Comprehensive Nuclear-Test-Ban Treaty Organization, the United Nations Office for Outer Space Affairs and the United Nations Industrial Development Organization. The office also acts as the Group's liaison to the Group of 77 and China and the Non-Aligned Movement
 New York
 The office in New York deals primarily with candidacy issues and other general topics.

References 

United Nations coalitions and unofficial groups
Latin America and the Caribbean